Teresa Margolles (born 1963) is a Mexican conceptual artist, photographer, videographer, and performance artist. As an artist she researches the social causes and consequences of death. Margolles communicates observations from the morgue in her home city, Mexico City, and other morgues located in Latin America, as well as the extended emotional distress and social consequences that occur as product of death by murder. While working around the topic of the body, her work extends to the families of the victims, the remaining living bodies that witness the death of a loved one. The main medium of her work comes from the morgues themselves, which she transforms into sensory experiences that provoke a feeling of memory to the audience. Margolles finds particularly remarkable how the activity inside the morgues reflects the truth from the outside. In the case of Mexico City, she observes that the majority of victims belong to the lower classes. "Looking at the dead you see society".

Life and career
Margolles was born in Culiacán, Mexico, in 1963. She originally trained as a forensic pathologist, and holds diplomas in science of communication and forensic medicine from Universidad Nacional Autonoma de Mexico, Mexico City, as well as studying art at the Direccion de Fomento a la Cultura Regional del Estado de Sinaloa, Culiacan, Mexico.

For her the morgue reflects society, particularly Mexican urban experience, where drug-related crime, poverty, political upheaval, and military action have resulted in violence and death;"The work of Teresa Margolles has always taken the human body and its liquid components as protagonists; they serve as vehicles for a relentless indictment of the growing violence in the world at large and in her own native country in particular, namely Mexico." Letizia Ragaglia, 2011

"When I was working with SEMEFO I was very interested in what was happening inside the morgue and the situations that were occurring, let's say, a few meters outside the morgue, among family members and relatives. But Mexico has changed so violently that it's no longer possible to describe what's happening outside from within the morgue. The pain, loss and emptiness are now found in the streets." Teresa Margolles, 2009In 1990, Margolles founded an artists' collective titled SEMEFO, which is an anagram for the Mexican coroner's office.  Other core members of SEMEFO included Arturo Angulo and Carlos Lopez, yet the group had a loose membership. Through performance and installation-based work, SEMEFO commented on social violence and death in Mexico.

Margolles left SEMEFO in the late 1990s. Since then her independent art practice continues to explore themes of death, violence and exclusion, specifically using forensic material and human remains. She uses materials retrieved from the morgue where she has her studio, such as the water used to wash corpses, which she uses as the foundation for her work;"The water comes from Mexico City’s morgue. It’s water used to wash the bodies of murder victims." Teresea Margolles, 2006In 2012 she was honored with a Prince Claus Award from the Netherlands and the 5th Artes Mundi prize for international contemporary art. She exhibits worldwide and has two works in the Tate collection; Flag I, a version of a work shown at the Venice Biennale in 2009 when Margolles represented Mexico, and 37 Bodies, which memorialises Mexican murder victims with short pieces of surgical thread knotted together to form a single line.  Her work is included in the main curated exhibition of the 2019 Venice Biennale "May You Live in Interesting Times".

In 2016 she was a part of the Current:LA Biennial made by the Department of Cultural Affairs in the city of Los Angeles.

Solo and significant group exhibitions 

2004: Museum für Moderne Kunst, Frankfurt am Main, Germany
2005: Guggenheim Museum, New York, USA
2008: Kunsthalle Krems, Krems an der Donau, Austria
2009: Venice Biennale (Mexican pavilion), Italy
2010: Fridericianum, Kassel, Margolles, Teresa. Frontera
2010: Los Angeles County Museum of Art (LACMA), Los Angeles, USA
2010: Sala de Arte Público Siqueiros (SAPS), Mexico City, Mexico
2011: MUSEION, Bolzano, Italy
2012: Lion Arts Centre, Adelaide, Australia
2012: El Museo Universitario Arte Contemporáneo (MUAC), Mexico City, Mexico
2014: Centro de Arte Dos de Mayo, Madrid, Spain
2014: Migros Museum für Gegenwartskunst, Zurich, Switzerland
2015: Neuberger Museum of Art, New York, USA
2016: Galerie Peter Kilchmann, Zurich, Switzerland
2016: Colby College Museum of Art, Waterville, Maine, USA
2018: Padiglione D'Arte Contemporanea (PAC), Milan, Italy
2019: Venice Biennale
2024: Fourth plinth in Trafalgar Square, London. (scheduled)

Literature 
Kittelmann, Udo & Klaus Görner (2004) Teresa Margolles. Muerte sin fin, Ostfildern-Ruit,  
Margolles, Teresa (2011) Margolles, Teresa. Frontera, Walther König, Cologne,  
Downey, Anthony (2009)  "127 Cuerpos: Teresa Margolles and the Aesthetics of Commemoration", Lund Humphries, London, 
Scott Bray, R (2007) "En piel ajena: The work of Teresa Margolles" Law Text Culture 11(1), pgs. 13-50, URL: http://ro.uow.edu.au/ltc/vol11/iss1/2/
Downey, Anthony (2012) "In the Event of Death: Teresa Margolles and the Life of the Corpse", in Artes Mundi 5, pp. 62–66
Heartney, Eleanor; Posner; Princenthal; Scott (2013) The Reckoning: Women Artists of the New Millennium, published by Prestel Verlag, pp. 206 – 213, 
Sileo, Diego. (2019) Teresa Margolles: Ya Basta Hijos de Puta, Silvana Editorale, 
Baddeley, Oriana (2007) 'Teresa Margolles and the Pathology of Everyday Death.' Dardo, 5. pp. 60-81.

References 
 Art Das Kunstmagazin (September 2006)  Reste des Lebens,

Mexican contemporary artists
Mexican photographers
Mexican video artists
Mexican women photographers
1963 births
Living people
Artists from Sinaloa
People from Culiacán